The former 18th Police Precinct Station House and Stable of the Brooklyn Police Department is a historic police station and stable located in the Sunset Park neighborhood of Brooklyn, New York City.  The two buildings were completed in 1892.  The station house, which later was used by the New York City Police Department's 68th Precinct, is a three-story brick building with carved stone detailing in the Romanesque Revival style.  It features a projecting corner tower and Norman-inspired projecting main entrance portico.  The stable is a two-story brick building connected to the station house by a one-story brick passage.  It ceased being used as a police station in 1970, and was bought by the Sunset Park School of Music.

The building was listed on the National Register of Historic Places in 1982, and was designated a New York City landmark in 1983.

See also
List of New York City Landmarks
National Register of Historic Places listings in New York County, New York

References

External links

Government buildings on the National Register of Historic Places in New York City
Government buildings completed in 1892
Infrastructure completed in 1892
Government buildings in Brooklyn
Renaissance Revival architecture in New York City
Police stations on the National Register of Historic Places
National Register of Historic Places in Brooklyn
1892 establishments in New York (state)
New York City Designated Landmarks in Brooklyn
Sunset Park, Brooklyn
New York City Police Department buildings